Marcel Schuon (born 28 April 1985) is a German former professional footballer who played as a centre-back or defensive midfielder.

Involvement in match-fixing scandal
Schuon was involved in the 2009 European football match-fixing scandal and claimed at the law public prosecution department Bochum, only few hours after admitting his involvement he was sacked by SV Sandhausen.

References

External links
 
 

1985 births
Living people
German footballers
Association football central defenders
Association football midfielders
Germany youth international footballers
VfB Stuttgart players
VfB Stuttgart II players
VfL Osnabrück players
SV Sandhausen players
2. Bundesliga players
3. Liga players
People from Freudenstadt
Sportspeople from Karlsruhe (region)
Footballers from Baden-Württemberg